The Canala River is a river of New Caledonia. It has a catchment area of 290 square kilometres, or 203 miles.

See also
List of rivers of New Caledonia

References

Rivers of New Caledonia